The first season of the French version of Dancing with the Stars debuted on TF1 on February 12, 2011. Eight celebrities were paired with eight professional ballroom dancers. Sandrine Quétier and Vincent Cerutti were the hosts for this season.

Participants

Scoring

Red numbers indicate the couples with the lowest score for each week.
Blue numbers indicate the couples with the highest score for each week.
 indicates the couples eliminated that week.
 indicates the returning couple that finished in the bottom two.
 indicates the winning couple.
 indicates the runner-up couple.
 indicates the third place couple.

Averages 
This table only counts dances scored on the traditional 30-point scale.

Highest and lowest scoring performances
The best and worst performances in each dance according to the judges' marks are as follows (out of 30, except for Cha-Cha-Cha Marathon and Samba Marathon):

Couples' Highest and lowest scoring performances
According to the traditional 30-point scale.

Styles, scores and songs

Week 1 

Individual judges scores in the chart below (given in parentheses) are listed in this order from left to right: Alessandra Martines, Jean-Marc Généreux, Chris Marques.

Running order

Week 2 

Individual judges scores in the chart below (given in parentheses) are listed in this order from left to right: Alessandra Martines, Jean-Marc Généreux, Chris Marques.

Running order

Week 3 

Individual judges scores in the chart below (given in parentheses) are listed in this order from left to right: Alessandra Martines, Jean-Marc Généreux, Chris Marques.

Theme: Movie night – each couple's dance is to an iconic song from the movies.

Running order

Week 4 

Individual judges scores in the chart below (given in parentheses) are listed in this order from left to right: Alessandra Martines, Jean-Marc Généreux, Chris Marques.

Running order

Week 5 

Individual judges scores in the chart below (given in parentheses) are listed in this order from left to right: Alessandra Martines, Jean-Marc Généreux, Chris Marques.

Running order

Week 6 

Individual judges scores in the chart below (given in parentheses) are listed in this order from left to right: Alessandra Martines, Jean-Marc Généreux, Chris Marques.

Running order

Call-Out Order 
The Table Lists in which order the contestants' fates were revealed by Quétier and Cerutti.

 The couple who got the best score from the judges.
 The couple who got the worst score from the judges but they're saved.
 The couple were in danger but the're saved.
 The couple who was eliminated.
 The winner couple.
 The couple who finished second in the competition.
 The couple who finished third in the competition.

Dance schedule
The celebrities and professional partners danced one of these routines for each corresponding week.
 Week 1: Cha-Cha-Cha, Quickstep or Viennese Waltz
 Week 2: Tango, Rumba or Jive
 Week 3: Paso Doble or Foxtrot and Samba marathon (Cinema Theme)
 Week 4: Two unlearned dances from Weeks 1-3
 Week 5: Two unlearned dances from Weeks 1-3 or Charleston or Salsa and Cha-Cha-Cha marathon (Retro Theme & Double Score Showdown)
 Week 6: One unlearned dance and one repeated dance (David & Silvia and Matt & Katrina) or two repeated dances (Sofia & Maxime) and Freestyle

Dance Chart

 Highest scoring dance
 Lowest scoring dance
 Danced, but not scored

Musical Guests

Ratings
Week 1 Performance Show & Results Show: 4 840 000 viewers (23,9%)
Week 2 Performance Show & Results Show: 5 034 000 viewers (24,5%)
Week 3 Performance Show & Results Show: 5 385 000 viewers (25,6%)
Week 4 Performance Show & Results Show: 4 805 000 viewers (23.5%)
Week 5 Performance Show & Results Show: 5 115 000 viewers (24.7%)
Week 6 (The Finale) Performance Show & Results Show: 4 960 000 viewers (24.8%)

Around the Show 
 André Manoukian had been a judge on the show Nouvelle Star, like Sinclair (season 8) and Lio (season 9). Amel Bent (season 3) was a contestant on Nouvelle Star in 2004.

References

Season 01
2011 French television seasons